The 2001 MAC Championship Game was played on November 30, 2001 at the Glass Bowl in Toledo, Ohio.  The game featured the winner of each division of the Mid-American Conference. The game featured the Marshall Thundering Herd, of the East Division, and the Toledo Rockets, of the West Division. The Rockets beat the Thundering Herd 41-36.

References

Championship Game
MAC Championship Game
Marshall Thundering Herd football games
Toledo Rockets football games
November 2001 sports events in the United States
MAC Championship Game